This article lists the winners and nominees for the NAACP Image Award for Outstanding Motion Picture, awarded by the U.S.-based National Association for the Advancement of Colored People (NAACP). This award has been given since 1972 and as of 2017, only two of the winning films have also won the Academy Award for Best Picture: Crash and 12 Years a Slave.

Nominees and winners
Winners are listed first and highlighted in bold. Year refers to year of ceremony, not year of release.

1970s

1980s

1990s

2000s

2010s

2020s

Stats and facts
Below are the top 5 most nominated and winning motion pictures.

Most wins

Most nominations

References

NAACP Image Awards
Awards for best film
African-American cinema